The 1990 British Formula 3000 Championship was the second season of the British Formula 3000 Championship. The series was won by Portugal's Pedro Chaves, driving the latest Reynard 90D for Mansell Madgwick Motosport, the team founded by Nigel Mansell. Chaves attempted to qualify the Coloni in F1 the following year without success, before moving to Indy Lights and Spanish touring cars. Runner up in the series was future touring car star Alain Menu driving for both Roni and CoBRa. Richard Dean, future Rover Turbo Cup champion, was best of the British contingent in third place with CoBRa. He concentrated on the series full-time after abandoning an International F3000 season due to mony problems. Rickard Rydell finished fourth overall for the AJS team.

Drivers and teams
The following drivers and teams contested the 1990 British Formula 3000 Championship.

Results

British Formula 3000 Championship

Championship Standings

References

Formula 3000
British Formula 3000 Championship